This is a list of the municipalities in the state of Santa Catarina (SC), located in the South Region of Brazil. Santa Catarina is divided into 295 municipalities, which are grouped into 20 microregions, which are grouped into 6 mesoregions.

See also
Geography of Brazil

Santa Catarina